La Muerte está mintiendo is a 1950 Argentine film.

Cast
 Narciso Ibáñez Menta (1912-2004),  Emilio Marín.
 María Rosa Gallo (1924-2004),  Marta Ferrari.
 Alita Román (1912-1989),  Carmen Noguera.
 Perla Mux (ca 1910-),  Isabel Pradas.
 Francisco Martínez Allende (d. 1954),  Roberto Marín.

External links
 

1950 films
1950s Spanish-language films
Argentine black-and-white films
Argentine drama films
1950 drama films
1950s Argentine films